Starorussky Uyezd (Старорусский уезд) was one of the subdivisions of the Novgorod Governorate of the Russian Empire. It was situated in the southwestern part of the governorate. Its administrative centre was Staraya Russa.

Demographics
At the time of the Russian Empire Census of 1897, Starorussky Uyezd had a population of 191,957. Of these, 99.0% spoke Russian, 0.3% Yiddish, 0.3% Polish, 0.2% German, 0.1% Estonian and 0.1% Belarusian as their native language.

References

 
Uezds of Novgorod Governorate
Novgorod Governorate